The Lullaby Tour was a 1989 U.S. concert tour by American electronic group Book of Love, in support of the act's second studio album, Lullaby, which was released in July 1988. The band had originally intended to tour in the fall of 1988, but the illness of a band member delayed the tour until 1989. The second single from the album and title track "Lullaby" was released on January 4, 1989 to coincide with the tour.

The band played several warm up shows in N.Y.C., Texas, and Oklahoma in late December 1988, with the official U.S. tour beginning in late February 1989, and lasting for four months, ending in June 1989. The band played two shows around Halloween in Baltimore and D.C. to promote the "Witchcraft" single.

The first show of the official tour took place at Club Axis in Boston, Massachusetts, on February 23, 1989. Throughout the tour, various local bands in each city functioned as the opening act. The band took two weeks out of their tour schedule in mid-April to remix the track "Witchcraft", and another week in May to edit the song for the next single. The tour concluded with the two consecutive nights at the 9:30 Club in Washington D.C. on June 29, 1989.

Props used on the tour were Lite-Brites and large framed portrait paintings of the band painted by Susan Ottaviano. The set included a cover of ABBA's "S.O.S.", and also the band's cover of Mike Oldfield's "Tubular Bells", which was performed as a separate song, instead of a medley with "Pretty Boys And Pretty Girls". (see External links for audio) For the encore performance of "Witchcraft", the band donned witches' hats.

The setlist was evenly divided between new Lullaby album tracks (up to eight new songs), and tracks from their debut, Book of Love.

Setlist

Sample of a setlist from the tour.

"Pretty Boys And Pretty Girls" 
"Melt My Heart"
"Happy Day"
"Modigliani (Lost In Your Eyes)"
"Oranges And Lemons"
"You Look Through Me"
"Boy" 
"You Make Me Feel So Good"
"With A Little Love" (Ted Ottaviano on lead vocals)
"S.O.S." (ABBA cover)
"Book of Love" 
"I Touch Roses" 
Encore: 
"Tubular Bells" 
"Lullaby"
"Witchcraft"

Tour dates

Performers
 Susan Ottaviano – Lead vocals
 Ted Ottaviano – Keyboards, tubular bells, melodica, vocals
 Lauren Roselli – Keyboards, vocals 
 Jade Lee – Keyboards, percussion, vocals

Crew 
 Jerry Vaccarino - Tour Manager
 Craig Overbay - Production Manager, house sound
 Rich Nardone - Stage Manager

References

External links
 
 

1989 concert tours